Mohammad Jahangir Alam is a Bangladesh Army Brigadier General and the former Additional Director General (Operations) at the Rapid Action Battalion (RAB) an elite multi-service unit of the Bangladesh Police. He was one of seven officers of RAB sanctioned by the United States for violation of human rights. He is the Commander of President Guard Regiment.

Early life 
Alam was born on 19 October 1973 in Dinajpur District, Bangladesh. He completed his master's degree in Defense Studies from the Bangladesh University of Professionals.

Career 
On 19 December 1993, Alam received his commission on the 29th long course of Bangladesh Military Academy. He was commissioned in the Infantry Corps of Bangladesh Army. He had taught at the School of Infantry and Tactics and served in the Kuwait Army on deputation for three years. He was trained in counter terrorist tactics in the United States. He had previously commanded the 38 East Bengal  Regiment of the 17th Infantry Division. He worked as a platoon Commander in the Bangladesh Military Academy.

In October 2018, Alam, then lieutenant colonel, hosted the seventh annual Pacific Resilience Disaster Response Exercise and Exchange between Bangladesh Army and U.S. Army Pacific. Alam was promoted on 11 January 2017 to colonel and appointed to the 19th Infantry Division, based at Shahid Salahuddin Cantonment, as the division Colonel Staff.

Alam was appointed the Additional Director General (Operations) at the Rapid Action Battalion on 17 September 2018 replacing Colonel Mohammad Anwar Latif Khan. He was appointed on deputation from Bangladesh Army. He oversaw special security arrangements for the Pahela Baishakh celebrations in 2019.

Alam left the Additional Director General (Operations) at the Rapid Action Battalion on 27 June 2019 and was replaced by Colonel Tofayel Mustafa Sorwar.  Alam had served as the Chairperson of Khagrachari Cantonment Public School and College and Commander of 203rd Infantry Brigade. Alam was promoted to Brigadier General and appointed the Commander of the President Guard Regiment.

U.S. sanctions 
On 10 December 2021, the U.S. Department of the Treasury placed sanctions on Alam and added him to its Specially Designated Nationals (SDN) list under the Global Magnistsky Act for engaging in serious human rights abuses relating to his tenure at RAB, including the Killing of Ekramul Haque. He was one of seven serving and former officers of RAB to be sanction by the United States. Following the sanctions, the United States Ambassador to Bangladesh, Earl R. Miller, was summoned by the Minister of Foreign Affairs of Bangladesh, A K Abdul Momen, who handed him a protest note. He was asked by Prime Bank Limited to close his account at the bank, which had been suspended, due to the U.S. sanctions.

References 

Living people
1973 births
People from Dinajpur District, Bangladesh
Bangladesh Army brigadiers
Rapid Action Battalion officers
Specially Designated Nationals and Blocked Persons List
Bangladesh University of Professionals alumni
People sanctioned under the Magnitsky Act